Defteri Agapi (Greek: Δεύτερη Αγάπη; English: Second Love) is the second album by Greek singer Natasa Theodoridou. It was released on 18 December 1998 by Sony Music Greece and received platinum certification, selling 80,000 units. This is the Natasa's best selling album and contains some of her most successful songs, including "Pou Perpatas", "Defteri Agapi", "Aharisti Kardia" and "Peripou".

Track listing

Credits 
Credits adapted from the album's liner notes.

Personnel 
Takis Argiriou: percussion (tracks: 2)
Romeos Avlastimidis: violin (tracks: 3)
Hakan Bingolou: säz (tracks: 1, 15)
Giannis Bithikotsis: baglama (tracks: 4, 8, 10, 16) || bouzouki (tracks: 4, 8, 9, 10, 13, 14, 15, 17) || cura (tracks: 3, 5, 6, 9, 10, 11, 13, 14, 16)
Charis Chalkitis: backing vocals (tracks: 1, 3, 5, 6, 9, 11, 12, 14, 15)
Akis Diximos: backing vocals (tracks: 1, 3, 5, 6, 9, 11, 12, 14, 15) || second vocal (tracks: 4, 8, 13, 15, 16)
Ntinos Georgountzos: keyboards (all tracks)
Stelios Goulielmos: backing vocals (tracks: 1, 3, 5, 6, 9, 11, 12, 14, 15)
Antonis Gounaris: cümbüş (tracks: 2, 3, 6) || guitar, orchestration, programming (all tracks) || oud (tracks: 5)
Anna Ioannidou: backing vocals (tracks: 1, 3, 5, 6, 9, 11, 12, 14, 15)
Katerina Kiriakou: backing vocals (tracks: 1, 3, 5, 6, 9, 11, 12, 14, 15)
Antonis Koulouris: drums (tracks: 2, 3, 4, 5, 7, 8, 10, 11, 13, 14, 15, 16)
Giorgos Kostoglou: bass (tracks: 2, 3, 4, 5, 7, 8, 10, 11, 13, 14, 15, 16)
Fedon Lionoudakis: accordion (tracks: 6, 11, 16)
Thanasis Vasilopoulos: clarinet (tracks: 7, 14)

Production 
Takis Argiriou (Argiriou Recordings studio): mix engineer
Thodoris Chrisanthopoulos (Fabelsound): mastering
Dimitris Dimitroulis: make up
Giannis Doulamis: executive producer
Antonis Glikos: artwork
Nicol: hair styling
Despina Saraga: styling
Kostas Savvidis (Argiriou Recordings studio): mix engineer, sound engineer
Katerina Sideridou: art direction
Tasos Vrettos: photographer

References

Natasa Theodoridou albums
Greek-language albums
1998 albums
Sony Music Greece albums